Mihoub is a town and commune in Médéa Province, Algeria. According to the 1998 census, it has a population of 11488.

References

Communes of Médéa Province